Jona Eliëser Joseph Oberski (20 March 1938) is a Dutch writer, and a nuclear physicist.

A year before his birth, his parents escaped from Nazi Germany to the Netherlands, and settled in Amsterdam. But when World War II broke out, the country was soon occupied, and there remained no other route available than the one forced upon all the other Jewish families. The family was transported through Westerbork and to Bergen-Belsen. Jona survived the war, but both his parents died. Oberski was on The Lost Train, a train heading East with no clear destination. The train was captured by the Red Army in Tröbitz.

He was taken care of by a foster family. He dedicated his first book Childhood to his foster parents:

After the war he went to school and university, specializing as a nuclear and particle physicist. Oberski is married, having three children. In 1962, he started to work for the National Institute for Subatomic Physics.

Published works 
In the '70s, Oberski joined a poetry workshop, after which it occurred to him to write about his own experiences of the Nazi concentration camps. In 1978, the book Kinderjaren (Childhood) was first published in The Netherlands. The book, in particular, follows the events through the eyes of a small child.

Translations of Childhood have been published in Canada, Denmark, Germany, United Kingdom, Finland, Greece, Hungary, Indonesia, Israel, Italy, Japan, Croatia, Norway, Poland, Spain, USA, Sweden. 
Childhood was filmed as "Jonah who lived in the whale", put unto DVD as "Look to the sky".

He further published two more literary works in Dutch, De ongenode gast (1995) (The Uninvited Visitor) and De eigenaar van niemandsland (1997) (The Proprietor of No Mans Land), and columns and articles for several magazines. Other published works are related to his science specialty, physics, like his: "An alpha-deuteron correlation experiment on carbon with the multidetector BOL (Ph.D. thesis) (1971)"

References

External links
Jona Oberski at the Digital Library for Dutch Literature 

1938 births
Living people
Dutch male poets
Dutch non-fiction writers
Dutch nuclear physicists
Dutch Jews
Westerbork transit camp survivors
Writers from Amsterdam
Bergen-Belsen concentration camp survivors
Male non-fiction writers